{{DISPLAYTITLE:C13H21NO3S}}
The molecular formula C13H21NO3S (molar mass: 271.38 g/mol) may refer to:

 2C-T-13 (2,5-dimethoxy-4-(β-methoxyethylthio)phenethylamine) 
 HOT-7

Molecular formulas